Sushil Kumar may refer to:

Sushil Kumar (biologist) (born 1940), Indian geneticist
Sushil Kumar (born 1983), Indian wrestler
Sushil Kumar (admiral) (1940–2019), Indian Chief of Naval Staff
Acharya Sushil Kumar (1926–1994), Jain evangelist